The Code: Crime and Justice is an Australian observational reality legal television series that aired on the Nine Network in February 2007. It was produced by Craig Graham and narrated by William McInnes. The Code followed Victoria police in the field, as well as cases brought to the Magistrates' Court of Victoria. Permission to film in the Court was granted by Chief Magistrate Ian Gray – a level of access considered unprecedented on Australian television.

Episodes

Production
While filming in January 2007, the camera crew was trailing police as they made armed entry into an apartment based on a call about a possible murder. The "corpse" reported by a neighbour turned out to be a mannequin.

Thirteen episodes were planned. Due to poor viewership performance, The Code was replaced by What's Good For You on the schedule after airing its third episode.

See also
 Cops (TV series)

References

Additional reading

External links 
 

2007 Australian television series debuts
2007 Australian television series endings
Nine Network original programming
Court shows
Australian factual television series
2000s Australian crime television series
Australian legal television series
2000s Australian documentary television series